Tripfall is a 2000 American thriller film directed and written by Serge Rodnunsky and starring Eric Roberts (as Eddie), John Ritter (as Tom Williams), Rachel Hunter (as Gina Williams), Michael Raynor (as Franklin Ross) and Katy Boyer (as Lonnie Campos). The music was composed by Evan Evans.

Plot 
The family of Tom Williams takes a vacation in California and is later kidnapped by Eddie, his girlfriend Lonnie and Franklin Ross. They want 1.2 million dollars.

Cast  
Eric Roberts as Eddie
John Ritter as Tom Williams
Rachel Hunter as Gina Williams
Michael Raynor as Franklin Ross
Katy Boyer as Lonnie Campos

External links

 

2000 films
2000 thriller films
American thriller films
2000s English-language films
2000s American films